Phellandrenes are a pair of organic compounds that have a similar molecular structure and similar chemical properties. α-Phellandrene and β-phellandrene are cyclic monoterpenes and are double-bond isomers. In α-phellandrene, both double bonds are endocyclic and in β-phellandrene, one of them is exocyclic. Both are insoluble in water, but miscible with diethyl ether.

α-Phellandrene was named after Eucalyptus phellandra, now called Eucalyptus radiata, from which it can be isolated. It is also a constituent of the essential oil of Eucalyptus dives. β-Phellandrene has been isolated from the oil of water fennel and Canada balsam oil.

The phellandrenes are used in fragrances because of their pleasing aromas. The odor of β-phellandrene has been described as peppery-minty and slightly citrusy.

The α-phellandrene isomer can form hazardous and explosive peroxides on contact with air at elevated temperatures.

Biosynthesis 
The biosynthesis of phellandrene begins with dimethylallyl pyrophosphate and isopentenyl pyrophosphate condensing in an SN1 reaction to form geranyl pyrophosphate. The resultant monoterpene undergoes cyclization to form a menthyl cationic species. A hydride shift then forms an allylic carbocation. Finally, an elimination reaction occurs at one of two positions, yielding either α-phellandrene or β-phellandrene.

References

Monoterpenes
Cyclohexenes
Cyclohexadienes
Conjugated dienes
Perfume ingredients